KBDL-LP (107.9 FM, "NOAA Weather Radio") is a low-power FM radio station licensed to Carbondale, Colorado, United States. The station is currently owned by State of Colorado Telecom Services.

History
The Federal Communications Commission issued a construction permit for the station on October 26, 2001. The station was assigned the KBDL-LP call sign on January 14, 2002, and received its license to cover on October 4, 2002.

References

External links
 

BDL-LP
Radio stations established in 2002
BDL-LP
2002 establishments in Colorado